"Made to Love" is a song by contemporary Christian singer tobyMac from his third album, Portable Sounds. It was released as the album's lead single on December 26, 2006. This was also included on the compilation album, WOW Hits 2008.

Music and lyrics
"Made to Love" is generally considered a Christian worship song, both musically and lyrically. It has been labeled as having a "laidback groove" with a neo soul sound. Toby has said it was meant to be released on the Welcome to Diverse City album but he was never satisfied with the verses. The idea of the song and chorus existed for over 4–5 years prior to the actual release. He has said it was barely done in time for Portable Sounds as well.

Release
"Made to Love" was released on December 26, 2006, in both the digital download and CD formats, and includes a "musical mayhem remix" by Matt Bronleewe. The song quickly began to climb on R&R's contemporary hit radio (CHR) chart at the start of 2007, and reached No. 1 during the first week of January 2007.

At the end of 2007, it placed as the second top-played song on R&R'''s Christian CHR chart for the year, and the seventh most played song on Christian AC radio. That year the song received a total of more than 23,800 plays on the Christian CHR format, and over 29,600 plays on the Christian AC format.

Reception
The song was received relatively well by music critics. Allmusic reviewer Rick Anderson said that the song felt "perfectly natural — though he does sound a bit too much like a Sting imitator during the reggae interlude near the end of 'Made to Love'." Kim Jones of About.com considered it to be tobyMac's best song of his solo career, and CCM Magazine'''s Christa Banister called it "irresistibly catchy".

Awards

In 2008, the song was nominated for a Dove Award for Song of the Year at the 39th GMA Dove Awards. The song also received a Grammy nomination in 2008 for Best Gospel Song.

Track listing

Charts

Weekly charts

Year-end charts

Decade-end charts

Certifications

References

External links
"Made to Love" lyrics at MTV.com

2006 singles
TobyMac songs
Songs written by TobyMac
Songs written by Cary Barlowe
2006 songs
ForeFront Records singles